The Bhottada (also known as Dhotada, Bhotra, Bhatra, Bhattara, Bhotora, Bhatara) is an ethnic group found mainly in many districts of Odisha and Chhattisgarh. The 2011 census showed their population to be around 450,771. They are classified as a Scheduled Tribe by the Indian government.

Etymology and origins 

The name Bhottada is derived from the words Bhu meaning earth and Tara, meaning chase. It is said that they migrated from Bastar.

Subdivisions

The tribe is divided into two divisions called Bada and Sana. Badas are higher in social hierarchy, They claim to be of purer descent. The divisions are endogamous however nowadays intermarriage takes place between them.

Culture 
They have a number of exogamous totemistic clans or gotras named after different animals such as tortoise, tiger, cobra, monkey, dog, lizard, goat, etc. The clan members who are of a particular animal totem respect the same animals.

The clans has agnatic lineages formed as local descent groups who live close to each other in villages.

Marriage by negotiation is called Bibha . It is considered ideal and prestigious. It involves elaborate process and is expensive. Other ways of acquiring mates such as by elopement, by capture, by service are practised. Cross-cousin marriage, junior levirate and sororate, divorce and remarriage are permitted on reasonable grounds.

They bury their dead. They worship Hindu deities and their own pantheon includes Budhi Thakurani, Bhairabi Budhi, Pardesi, Basumata, Banadurga, etc. Their chief festibhals are Chait Parab , Akhiturti,Nua Khiaand Dussera. The traditional chief of the village is the Naik. Assisted by Chalan, Pujari and Gonda, he handles the community affairs. At the regional level a group of villages constitute a Desh headed by Bhat Naik and supported by Panigrahi and Desia Gonda who mitigate inter-village disputes.

See also
 Tribes of India

References

Scheduled Tribes of India
Social groups of Odisha
Scheduled Tribes of Odisha